Constance M. "Connie" Levi (born August 1939) is a Minnesota politician who served as Minnesota House Majority Leader from 1985 to 1987. She was the first woman to serve as majority leader and the first to hold a senior leadership position in the Minnesota Legislature.

Levi was born in 1939, and attended Augustana College and the University of Oregon. She served on the Dellwood city council before being elected to the State House of Representatives in 1979. She served four terms, serving as majority leader during her last term. She did not seek re-election in 1986.

Levi went on to become president of the Minneapolis Chamber of Commerce, and served as an interim chief of staff to Minnesota Gov. Arne Carlson in 1991. She currently serves on the board of a number of index funds for Thrivent Financial and Norstan, Inc.

Connie is married to Arlo Levi, and has two children, Todd and Julie.

References

External links

1939 births
Living people
People from Washington County, Minnesota
Women state legislators in Minnesota
Republican Party members of the Minnesota House of Representatives
20th-century American politicians
Augustana College (Illinois) alumni
University of Oregon alumni
20th-century American women politicians
21st-century American women